The Women's 1500 metres (T54) at the 2010 Commonwealth Games as part of the athletics programme was held at the Jawaharlal Nehru Stadium on Friday 8 October 2010.

Results

External links
2010 Commonwealth Games - Athletics

Women's 1500 metres (T54)
2010 in women's athletics